Top Gear Live (previously known as the MPH Show) was a supercar motor show. It was held annually at Earls Court beginning in 2003, later expanding to be also held at the Birmingham NEC from 2005 with the two shows being around one week apart. The show took up either one or two halls at both venues, and there were usually two parts to it: the Exhibition and the Main Show. From 2011 the show was rebranded and relaunched as "Top Gear Live", tying together its close links to the Top Gear television series and with a venue change to ExCeL London. Top Gear Live was later expanded, being used by BBC Worldwide as a brand of touring stadium show.

Exhibition Section 
Visitors arrive and have the opportunity to take a look at exhibitors' stands.  Many are there to advertise a product that they sell (for example there was a 'Shell' stand at MPH '06 advertising Shell V Power) There are also exhibition stands advertising car lease, whilst showing actual cars that can be leased at the stand.  These are the likes of the Ferrari Enzo, Lamborghini Murcielago LP640, Ferrari F430 or the Aston Martin DBS V12.
There are also a few car manufacturers exhibiting, although not to the scale of the 'Sunday Times Motor Show'.  At MPH 2006, Land Rover turned half of the hall into a simulated off-road environment with ramps and severe slopes, on which people could drive the new Land Rover Discovery 3.

There are also VIP enclosures such as 'The Sunday Times' enclosure, or the 'Auto Express' enclosure in which people with VIP tickets can go and enjoy a glass of wine for example.  Overall, the exhibition side of the show is very  and does not include many car manufacturers.

Main show 

The main event is a 90-minute show, which takes up an entire hall and has the audience sitting in stadium-like seating. The show features stunt driving and a catwalk-style presentation of new cars.  Also included in the show are the usual team antics, well known from Top Gear and TGT; at MPH 2006 they placed James May in a shopping trolley and pushed him across the hall with a Ford Mustang at 40 mph into huge ten-pin bowling skittles.

There were also 3D presentations during the show; for example MPH 2005, included a virtual and life-size 3D Apache helicopter shooting at a real Lotus Elise as it raced around the arena. Pyrotechnics added live explosions to the display, simulating missile hits and ricochets from gunfire; due to its success, it made a return appearance in 2006. MPH 2006 also included a virtual 3D Hummer being dropped out of an aircraft, shot down by a Tornado jet, and landing in pieces in the ocean. A 3D Gatso Camera/Dragon of the future battled it out with the Stig at MPH 2007.

In 2006, the MPH show was presented by Jeremy Clarkson and James May (Top Gear presenters), and Tiff Needell (Fifth Gear presenter) who was drafted in to cover for Richard Hammond who could not make the show due to a crash.  At MPH 2007 the presenters were Jeremy Clarkson, James May and Richard Hammond (then the Top Gear presenters).

Exhibited cars in the MPH 2006 show included the Caparo T1, Pagani Zonda F, Jaguar XKR, Lamborghini LP640, Bentley GTC, Koenigsegg CCX, Spyker C8, Spyker D8, Lamborghini Gallardo Spyder, Invicta, and the Porsche Cayenne Magnum black gunsmoke.

Tour dates

External links
 Official MPH 07 Site
 MPH 07 Exhibitor List
 MPH Theatrical Show
 MPH 06 Shopping Trolley Bowling
 MPH 06 Car Football

Auto shows
Top Gear